is one of the eight major title tournaments in professional shogi. The word means the 'king of shogi' (棋 ki 'shogi' + 王 ō 'king').

Overview
The tournament started in 1974 as a continuation of the Saikyōshakettei tournament (最強者決定戦), which was held from 1961 to 1973. (The Saikyōshakettei itself was a continuation of the 九、八、七段戦 [1954–1956] and the 日本一杯争奪戦 [1957–1960].) The Kiō tournament was promoted to a title tournament in 1975. The championship match is held from February to March. The challenger for the Kiō title is determined by the first and second preliminary rounds. In the second round, the losers in the semi-finals and final play consolation games, then the winners of the final and consolation-final advance to a two-game playoff. The winner of the consolation games has to win both games to become the challenger while the winner of the final has to win only one of the two games. The first player to win three games in the championship becomes the new Kiō titleholder.

Lifetime Kiō 
Lifetime (Eisei) Kiō is the title given to a player who won the championship five times in a row. Active players may qualify for this title, but it is only officially awarded upon their retirement or death. In 1995 (the 20th Kiō Match), Yoshiharu Habu won his fifth Kiō title in a row, thus becoming the first professional to qualify for the title. In 2017, Akira Watanabe won his fifth title in a row to join Habu as the only professionals to have accomplished this feat.

Winners 
The following table shows a list of past winners.

Records
 Most titles overall: Yoshiharu Habu, 13
 Most consecutive titles: Yoshiharu Habu, 12 in a row (1991-2002)

References

External links
Kiō Match Official Site  by Kyodo News and the Japanese Shogi Association

 
Shogi tournaments